Hans Eklind (born 1966) is a Swedish politician.  he serves as Member of the Riksdag from the Christian Democrats representing the constituency of Örebro County.

He was also elected as Member of the Riksdag in September 2022.

References 

Living people
1966 births
Place of birth missing (living people)
21st-century Swedish politicians
Members of the Riksdag 2018–2022
Members of the Riksdag 2022–2026
Members of the Riksdag from the Christian Democrats (Sweden)